Below is a list of German language exonyms for towns and villages in Transylvania, Romania.

See also
German exonyms
List of European exonyms
List of Transylvanian Saxon localities

Romania geography-related lists
Transylvania
Geography of Transylvania
Names of places in Romania